Remembrance: A Memorial Benefit is the twelfth album of pianist George Winston, released in 2001. All money earned with this album was donated to benefit funds to help the ones who had lost their beloved ones in the September 11, 2001 attacks. It features Winston performing on piano, acoustic guitar and harmonica.

Track listing 

† = bonus track

References

External links
Liner notes. Accessed 12/26/2021

2001 albums
George Winston albums
Charity albums
Windham Hill Records albums